Vladimir Nikolaevich Eshinov (born 18 February 1949) is a Russian rower who competed for the Soviet Union in the 1972 Summer Olympics and in the 1976 Summer Olympics.

He was born in Kirishi.

In 1972 he was a crew member of the Soviet boat which finished fifth in the coxed pair event.

Four years later he won the gold with the Soviet boat in the coxed fours competition.

References

External links
 

1949 births
Living people
Russian male rowers
Soviet male rowers
Olympic rowers of the Soviet Union
Rowers at the 1972 Summer Olympics
Rowers at the 1976 Summer Olympics
Olympic gold medalists for the Soviet Union
Olympic medalists in rowing
World Rowing Championships medalists for the Soviet Union
Medalists at the 1976 Summer Olympics
European Rowing Championships medalists
People from Kirishi
Sportspeople from Leningrad Oblast